CompuServe Information Manager (CIM) was CompuServe Information Service's client software, used with the company's Host Micro Interface (HMI). The program provided a GUI front end to the text-based CompuServe service that was at the time accessed using a standard terminal program with alphanumerical shortcuts.

Other CompuServe client programs
 TapCIS
 OzWin
 NavCIS
 ForCIS
 AutoSIG

References

1990 software
CompuServe
Classic Mac OS software
DOS software
OS/2 software
Windows software